Papatoetoe Wildcats is an American football club established in 1986 in South Auckland, New Zealand. The club was founded as the Central Pirates by Pose Tafa, then the East Auckland Wildcats, but moved to South Auckland renaming them as the Papatoetoe Wildcats.

The club has produced some elite New Zealand based players who have since travelled abroad.

The Wildcats have a direct membership of approximately 40 Premier Men playing in the American Football Auckland competition under the auspices of the New Zealand American Football Association or the NZAFA, its national body.  The Wildcats also have an Under 19s (Colts) team and an Under 16s (Junior) team.  Most of the players come from various sporting codes, mainly from Rugby Union and Rugby League.

The Wildcats currently practice at the Manukau Sportsbowl and previous practice at Papatoetoe Intermediate and the Papatoetoe Panthers Rugby League club grounds.

The Wildcats have had a number of players play nationally and overseas:

Tyer Matia who played for the Coventry Jets in 2007 and in 2009 played Arena Football in the AF2 league for the Rio Grande Dorados in Texas USA. Tyler is assigned to play for the Dorados again in 2009. Tyler was also a part of the New Zealand under 21 Colts national team that beat Australia on home soil in 2003.

 Joseph Taula is also playing a season in the USA for the Arena Football AF2 team the Tri Cities Fever in Washington and was then traded to the Stockton Lightning. He will be playing for the lightning again in 2009.. Joseph has played at all level s in New Zealand and represented New Zealand at the Colts and Senior Men's Ironblacks 2001 and 2003.

Albert Bernard has been assigned by AF@ Agent Jason Vaka to the Iowa BArnstormers for 2009. Albert represented New Zealand as an Ironblack in 2001 and 2003.

Thomas Wynne who played in a preseason game with the Coventry Jets in 2007 also joined the Coventry Jets with Tyler Matia for Britbowl XXII winning 33 to 32 against rivals the London Blitz. Thomas represented New Zealand as an Ironblack in 2001 and then in 2005.

The club has established an ongoing relationship with British American football club the Coventry Jets

Achievements
 2002 Snr Kiwi Bowl XX Winners
 2002 National Club III Winners
 2002 U18 Kiwi Bowl IV Winners
 2004 U18 Kiwi Bowl VI Winners
 2008 Unified Kiwibowl  XXVII Winners
 2010 Unified Kiwibowl  XXIX Winners
 2011 Colts Unity Bowl Winners
 2011 Unified Kiwibowl  XXX Winners
 2012 Colts Unity Bowl Winners
 2014 Unified Kiwibowl  XXXII Winners
 2016 Unified Kiwibowl  XXXIV Winners
 2017 Unified Kiwibowl XXXV Winners

See also
 New Zealand American Football Federation

References

External links
 Official Website
fb.me/papatoetoewildcats
Papatoetoe Wildcats Facebook https://www.facebook.com/groups/49085799737/

American football in New Zealand
1986 establishments in New Zealand
American football teams established in 1986
Ōtara-Papatoetoe Local Board Area